Saelania is a genus of mosses in the monotypic family Saelaniaceae in subclass Dicranidae. The genus was previously placed in family Ditrichaceae. Saelania is named after Finnish botanist Thiodolf Saelan.

Species

The genus Saelania contains four species:

Saelania caesia 
Saelania glaucescens 
Saelania pruinosa 
Saelania subglaucescens

References

Moss genera
Grimmiales